Muktar Said Ibrahim (born 24 January 1978), also known as Muktar Mohammed Said, is an Eritrean-British terrorist, who was found guilty of involvement in the attempted 21 July attacks on London's public transport system in 2005. He attempted to detonate a device on a London bus and was arrested sharing an apartment with Ramzi Mohammed on 29 July 2005. During the arrest, which culminated in Ramzi and Ibrahim standing near-naked on their balcony to avoid tear gas that police had used.

He was originally from Asmara, Eritrea, and arrived in the UK as a child dependent of asylum seekers in 1990, and was granted residency in 1992.  It has been reported that he applied for naturalisation as a British citizen in November 2003 and was issued with a British passport in September 2004. He had been living in Stoke Newington, London. Ibrahim was convicted of robbery and jailed for five years in 1996 for committing the crime and also carrying a knife. His family were apparently unaware of any involvement in terrorist activities and have publicly distanced themselves from him since the bombing attempts.

Early life
Ibrahim was educated at Canons High School in Edgware.

Arrest and trial 
29 July 2005 Ibrahim was arrested and in February 2007 tried alongside five other suspects for his part in the attempted bombings.

9 July 2007 he was found guilty at Woolwich Crown Court of conspiracy to murder and sentenced to life imprisonment, to serve a minimum of forty years before being considered for release.

Appeal 
April 2008 the court of appeal judges dismissed a challenge by Ibrahim, Omar, Mohammed and Osman to their convictions.

In December 2014, an appeal to the European Court of Human Rights lodged in 2008 by the bombers, claiming that their rights were breached in the 'safety interviews' after their arrests, was rejected.

See also 

Yasin Hassan Omar
Osman Hussain
Ramzi Mohammed

References 

1978 births
Living people
Eritrean Islamists
July 2005 London bombings
Eritrean emigrants to England
Perpetrators of the July 2005 London bombings
Prisoners sentenced to life imprisonment by England and Wales
English Islamists
Naturalised citizens of the United Kingdom
British people convicted of robbery
21st-century British criminals
People educated at Canons High School